When I Met You may refer to:

Films
When I Met U, 2009

Music
"When I Met You" (Fantasia song), 2016
"When I Met You", song by Widow Maker from Widowmaker (album), 1976
"When I Met You", song by Ariel Rivera from Aawitin Ko Na Lang, 1999
"When I Met You", song by APO Hiking Society from True to My Music, 1983
"When I Met You", by Shane Filan from You and Me, 2013
"When I Met You", song by David Bowie from No Plan (EP), 2016